Brandon Reed (born October 22, 1980) is an American politician from Hodgenville, Kentucky. He is a Republican and represents District 24 in the Kentucky House of Representatives. Reed is a licensed minister and is involved with various agriculture and farming associations.

References 

Living people
1980 births
Republican Party members of the Kentucky House of Representatives
21st-century American politicians
Place of birth missing (living people)